The Washington County Courthouse at 110 E. Main in Brenham, Texas is an Art Deco-style courthouse built in 1939.  It was listed on the National Register of Historic Places in 1990 and is also part of the National Register-listed Brenham Downtown Historic District.

It is the fourth courthouse of Washington County;  previous ones were built in 1844, 1852, and 1883.  This was designed by architect Travis Broesche of the firm Henrick and Lindsley, Inc.  It was built with Works Progress Administration assistance by contractor C.L. Browning, Jr.

See also

National Register of Historic Places listings in Washington County, Texas
Recorded Texas Historic Landmarks in Washington County
List of county courthouses in Texas

References

External link

Courthouses in Texas
Courthouses on the National Register of Historic Places in Texas
National Register of Historic Places in Washington County, Texas
Art Deco architecture in Texas
Government buildings completed in 1939
1939 establishments in Texas